Smith Apartments is a historic three-story building in Salt Lake City, Utah. It was built as a U-shaped residential building by Andrew and James E. McDonald in 1908, and designed in the Prairie School style by architects Walter E. Ware and Alberto O. Treganza. It belonged to David Smith, a rancher from Idaho, until 1944, when it was acquired by the Riverton Motor Company. It has been listed on the National Register of Historic Places since October 20, 1989.

References

National Register of Historic Places in Salt Lake City
Prairie School architecture in Utah
Residential buildings completed in 1908
1908 establishments in Utah